The following is a timeline of the history of the municipality of Bruges, Belgium.

Prior to 18th century

 865 Fort built by Margrave Baldwin I of Flanders.
 1000 Regional Brugse Vrije established (approximate date).
 1127 Count Charles I of Flanders assassinated.
 1134 Storm creates Zwin inlet, connecting Bruges to the North Sea.
 1146 Eekhout Abbey active (approximate date).
 1150 St. John's Hospital founded (approximate date).
 1157 Chapel of the Holy Blood built (approximate date).
 1180 Damme harbour built near Bruges.
 1223 St. Salvator's Church rebuilt.
 1240 Belfry of Bruges built in the Markt (approximate date).
 1244 Ten Wijngaerde Béguinage founded (approximate date).
 1294  built on the Grote Markt.
 1297
 Area of Bruges expanded.
 Church of Our Lady tower built.
 1302
 18 May: Bruges Matins (massacre) occurs.
 French-Flemish Battle of the Golden Spurs fought in Kortrijk; Flemish win.
 1303 Procession of the Holy Blood instituted.
 1323–1328 The Flemish revolt spread to Bruges.
 1364 Les Halles built on the Grote Markt.
 1368  (city gate) rebuilt.
 1369  (city gate) rebuilt.
 1390 Public clock installed (approximate date).
 1417  built (approximate date).
 1421 Bruges City Hall built.
 1425 Artist Jan van Eyck active in Bruges.
 1430 Order of the Golden Fleece founded in Bruges.
 1434 Grafenburg (castle) dismantled.
 1465 Artist Hans Memling active in Bruges (approximate date).
 1468 July: Wedding of Burgundian duke Charles and Margaret of York.
 1475 Printing press in operation.
 1488 Political unrest.
 1489 Memling paints the St. Ursula Shrine in St. John's Hospital.
 1505 Fuggers move from Bruges to Antwerp.
 1545 Hanseatic enterprise moves from Bruges to Antwerp.
 1559 Roman Catholic Diocese of Bruges established.
 1623  dug.

18th–19th centuries
 1719 Academy of Art established.
 1743 Lawyer's guild established.
 1786  demolished.
 1787
  established.
 Cloth Hall demolished.
 1794 French in power.
 1798  (library) opens.
 1799 St. Donatian's Cathedral demolished.
 1815 Bruges becomes part of the Netherlands.
 1830 Bruges becomes part of Belgium.
 1837 Journal de Bruges French-language newspaper begins publication.
 1838 Brugge railway station opens.
 1839  founded.
 1855  canal commissioned.
 1863 Population: 50,986.
 1887 Monument to Breydel/de Coninck erected in the Grote Markt.
 1891
 Club Brugge KV football club formed.
 Post and Telegraph office built on the Grote Markt.
 1892 Rodenbach's novel Bruges-la-Morte published.
 1899 Cercle Brugge K.S.V. football club formed.
 1900 Bruges derby football rivalry active.

20th century

 1905  (canal) dug.
 1907 Port of Bruges-Zeebrugge opens.
 1919 Population: 53,489.
 1924  becomes mayor.
 1928 Hollywood Cinema opens.
 1958 Procession of the Golden Tree revived.
 1960 Musica Antiqua Bruges festival begins.
 1963  established.
 1973 Koninklijk Atheneum Vijverhof (school) established in Sint-Michiels.
 1975 Jan Breydel Stadium opens.
 1977  becomes mayor.
 1982  of music begins.
 1983 De Karmeliet restaurant in business.
 1984  (bridges) built.
 1986 De Werf cultural centre founded.
 1987 6 March: Ferry Herald of Free Enterprise capsizes in the port.
 1988 20 September: British prime minister gives speech in city.
 1995  becomes mayor.
 1998 Start of annual Tour of Flanders cycling race moves to Bruges.

21st century
 2008 Frietmuseum opens in the Saaihalle.
 2010 April: Catholic bishop Vangheluwe resigns.
 2013
 Renaat Landuyt becomes mayor.
 Population: 117,170.

See also
 Bruges history
 
 List of mayors of Bruges
 
 Timelines of other municipalities in Belgium: Antwerp, Brussels, Ghent, Leuven, Liège
 History of urban centers in the Low Countries

References

This article incorporates information from the Dutch Wikipedia.

Bibliography

In English
 
 
 

 

 
 
  + 1881 ed.

 de Roover, Raymond. Money, Banking and Credit in Mediaeval Bruges: Italian Merchant-Bankers Lombards and Money-Changers: A Study in The Origins of Banking (Harvard U.P. 1948)

In other languages

External links

 
Bruges
Bruges
Years in Belgium